Hillsdale Township may refer to:

 Hillsdale Township, Michigan
 Hillsdale Township, Winona County, Minnesota
 Hillsdale Township, Eddy County, North Dakota, in Eddy County, North Dakota
 Hillsdale Township, Wells County, North Dakota, in Wells County, North Dakota
 Hillsdale Township, Faulk County, South Dakota, in Faulk County, South Dakota

Township name disambiguation pages